Christina Fulton (born June 26, 1967) is an American actress.

Career
Fulton has worked as a model with Elite Model Management and with LA Models. She was the face of Farlow Jeans and modeled for the "Too Cute" campaign.

Fulton has had roles in such films as Oliver Stone's The Doors as Velvet Underground singer Nico, Bram Stoker's Dracula, Dangerous Game, The Girl with the Hungry Eyes, Enemies of Laughter, Lucinda's Spell and Snake Eyes.

Fulton hosts a weekly online show, Playing It Forward.

In 2006, Fulton directed and produced the documentary When Giants Collide about the plight of Beverly Hills High School's wrestling program being on the brink of extinction.

Personal life
Fulton has a son, Weston Coppola Cage (born 1990), with actor Nicolas Cage.

Fulton was engaged to Shagrath, vocalist of the black metal band Dimmu Borgir in 2008.

References

External links

1967 births
American film actresses
Coppola family
Living people
Female models from Idaho